Percival's trident bat (Cloeotis percivali) is a species of bat in the family Hipposideridae. It is monotypic within the genus Cloeotis. It is found in Sub-Saharan Africa, with its core distribution in Southern Africa. It has been reported from Botswana, Democratic Republic of the Congo, Eswatini, Kenya, Mozambique, South Africa, Tanzania, Zambia, and Zimbabwe. Its natural habitats are savannas where there are suitable caves and mine tunnels that it can use for roosting. Colonies are never large (no more than about 300 individuals). Local numbers fluctuate greatly. Colonies can disappear, perhaps because they move to another place or go extinct.

References

Hipposideridae
Bats of Africa
Mammals of Botswana
Mammals of the Democratic Republic of the Congo
Mammals of Eswatini
Mammals of Kenya
Mammals of Mozambique
Mammals of South Africa
Mammals of Tanzania
Mammals of Zambia
Mammals of Zimbabwe
Mammals described in 1901
Taxa named by Oldfield Thomas
Taxonomy articles created by Polbot